Blairsden may refer to:

 Blairsden, California
 Blairsden, a mansion in Peapack-Gladstone, New Jersey